María Verónica Martínez Espinoza (born 20 July 1949) is a Mexican politician affiliated with the PRI. She currently serves as Senator of the LXII Legislature of the Mexican Congress representing Jalisco, filling the seat of Arturo Zamora Jiménez since 5 March 2013. She also served in the Congress of Jalisco

References

1949 births
Living people
Women members of the Senate of the Republic (Mexico)
Members of the Senate of the Republic (Mexico)
Institutional Revolutionary Party politicians
21st-century Mexican politicians
21st-century Mexican women politicians
University of Guadalajara alumni
Members of the Congress of Jalisco